Softball at the 2015 Pacific Games was held from 15–17 July 2015 at the Bisini Softball Diamonds. Only two teams entered the women's tournament: American Samoa and hosts Papua New Guinea.

The gold medal was decided by playing a best of three series, with Papua New Guinea winning 17–0 and 7–0 in the first two games.

Events

Medal summary

References

2015 Pacific Games
2015